Nokay Lake is a lake in Crow Wing County, in the U.S. state of Minnesota.

Nokay Lake was named for Chief Nokay of the Ojibwe Indians.

References

Lakes of Minnesota
Lakes of Crow Wing County, Minnesota